Sean McEwen (born June 27, 1993) is a professional Canadian football offensive lineman for the Calgary Stampeders of the Canadian Football League (CFL). He played CIS football for the Calgary Dinos.

Professional career

Toronto Argonauts
McEwen was drafted by the Toronto Argonauts third overall in the first round of the 2015 CFL Draft after being ranked as the tenth best overall player available by the CFL Central Scouting Bureau. Shortly after the draft, he attended mini-camp with the National Football League's New York Giants, but was not signed by the team and he returned to the University of Calgary for his final year.

On May 13, 2016, it was announced that McEwen had agreed to a three-year contract with the Argonauts. He appeared in 16 games during the 2016 season, starting in 11, en route to being named the Argonauts nominee for Most Outstanding Rookie. On March 9, 2017, it was announced that McEwen had signed an extension through the 2019 season. At the end of that year, he was named a CFL All-Star at centre.

In 2019, he was the Toronto Argonauts' Most Outstanding Offensive Lineman. Over four seasons, he had played in all 72 regular season games as well as two post-season games, including a win in 105th Grey Cup game. As a pending free agent in 2020, he was released during the free agency negotiation window on February 7, 2020.

Calgary Stampeders
On February 8, 2020, it was announced that McEwen had signed a two-year contract with his hometown Calgary Stampeders.

References

External links
Calgary Stampeders bio 

1993 births
Living people
Canadian football offensive linemen
Players of Canadian football from Alberta
Canadian football people from Calgary
Toronto Argonauts players
Calgary Dinos football players
Calgary Stampeders players